Cheirothrix (meaning "hand hair") is an extinct genus of ray-finned fish.

One of the species in this genus is Cheirothrix lewisii, known from the Late Cretaceous of Lebanon.

References

External links
Cheirothrix - Gnathostomata - Alepisauriformes - The Paleobiology Database

Prehistoric teleostei
Prehistoric ray-finned fish genera
Late Cretaceous fish of Asia